Wounded Land is a 2015 Israeli drama film directed by Erez Tadmor. It was nominated for Best Film at the 2015 Ophir Awards.

Cast
 Tawfeek Barhom
 Makram Khoury
 Keren Berger
 Yoav Levi

References

External links
 

2015 films
2015 drama films
Israeli drama films
2010s Hebrew-language films